Justin Barr (born 1983) is a young American Internet entrepreneur and co-founder of TapIt, a mobile advertising platform based out of Irvine, California.

Barr co-founded the company in 2011 at the age of 28. In 2012, the company was acquired by Phunware for $23M.

Barr has been a featured speaker for the Teen Entrepreneurs Academy in Irvine, CA and several Mobile Marketing conferences and is an active board member of the Orange County Entrepreneurs' Organization focusing on the production of the Global Student Entrepreneur Awards. In 2013 he was recognized as one of OC Register Metro's 40 Under 40, an annual list of 40 youthful entrepreneurs, activists and rising-star business professionals. Barr was nominated in 2017 Orange County Business Journal's annual "Innovator of the Year" awards.

References

Living people
1983 births
American technology chief executives